Soe may refer to:

Places
 Soe, Timor, a city in Indonesia
 Soe, Põlva County, a village in Orava Parish, Estonia
 Soe, Viljandi County, a village in Tarvastu Parish, Estonia
 Soé River, a river in Paraíba, Brazil

People
 Aung Soe (1924–1990), Burmese painter
 Soe Hok Gie (1942–1969), Indonesian journalist and activist
 Soe Myat Min (born 1982), Burmese football player
 Soe Win (1947–2007), Burmese politician
 Thakin Soe (1906–1989), Burmese politician

See also
 SOE (disambiguation)